Nakshi kantha, a type of embroidered quilt, is a centuries-old Bengali art tradition of the Bengal region, notable in Bangladesh and Indian states of West Bengal, Tripura and part of Assam. The basic material used is thread and old cloth. Nakshi kanthas are made throughout Bangladesh, but the greater Mymensingh, Jamalpur, Bogra, Rajshahi, Faridpur and Jessore, Chittagong areas are most famous for this craft.

The colourful patterns and designs that are embroidered resulted in the name "Nakshi Kantha", which was derived from the Bengali word "naksha", which refers to artistic patterns. The early kanthas had a white background accented with red, blue and black embroidery; later yellow, green, pink and other colours were also included. The running stitch called "kantha stitch" is the main stitch used for the purpose. Traditionally, kantha was produced for the use of the family. Today, after the revival of the nakshi kantha, they are produced commercially.

Word origin 
The word kantha has no discernible etymological root. The exact time of origin of the word kantha is not accurately known but it probably had a precursor in kheta (khet Bengali means "field"). According to the word kantha originated from the Sanskrit word kontha, which means rags, as kantha is made of rags.

Tradition
Like any other folk art, kantha making is influenced by factors such as materials available, daily needs, climate, geography, and economic factors. Probably the earliest form of kantha was the patchwork kantha, and the kanthas of the decorative appliqué type evolved from this.

In literature
The earliest mention of Bengal Kantha is found in the book Sri Sri Chaitanya Charitamrita by Krishnadas Kaviraj, which was written some five hundred years ago. The famous Bengali poet Jasimuddin also had a very famous poem 'Nakshi Kanthar Math' on Nakshi Kantha

Making
Traditionally old sarees, lungis and dhotis were used to make kanthas. Kantha making was not a full-time job. Women in almost every household were expert in the art. Rural women worked at leisure time or during the lazy days of the rainy season, so taking months or even years to finish a kantha was normal.  At least five to sixty nine sarees were needed to make a standard-size kantha. Today the old materials are replaced by new cotton cloths. Traditionally the thread was collected from the old sarees. That is rarely done today.

When a kantha is being made, first the sarees are joined to attain the required size, and then layers are spread out on the ground. The cloths are then smoothed, and no folds or creases are left in between. During the process, the cloth is kept flat on the ground with weights on the edges. Then the four edges are stitched and two or three rows of large running stitches are done to keep the kantha together. At this stage, the kantha can be folded and stitched at leisure time.

Originally, designs and motifs were not drawn on the cloth. The design was first outlined with needle and thread, followed by focal points, and then the filling motifs were done. In a kantha with a predominant central motif the centre was done first, followed by corner designs and the other details. In some types of kanthas (carpet, lik and sujni, etc.) wooden blocks were used to print the outline. The blocks are replaced today by patterns drawn in tracing papers.

Types
The following is how kanthas are categorized, according to the stitch type:

Running stitch 

The running stitch kantha is truly the indigenous Zidan Al Hakim. They are subdivided into Nakshi (figured) and par tola (patterned). Nakshi (figured) kanthas are further divided into motif or scenic kanthas.

Lohori kantha 
The name was derived from Sanskrit, as in "'Soundarya Lahari" or "Shivananda Lahari"- Religious poetic works in Sanskrit by Adi Shankara. It is also found in Persian Language giving the same meaning, 'lehr, which is "wave". This type of kantha is particularly popular in Rajshahi. These kanthas are further divided into soja (straight or simple), Kautar khupi (pigeon coop or triangle), borfi or diamond (charc

Lik or anarasi 

The Lik or Anarasi (pineapple) type of kantha is found in the Chapainawabganj and Jessore areas. The variations are lik tan, lik tile, lik jhumka, and lik lohori.

Cross-stitch or carpet 

This type of kantha was introduced by the English during the British Rule in India. The stitch used in this kanthas is the cross-stitch.

Sujni kantha 

This type of kantha is found only in Rajshahi area. The popular motif used is the undulating floral and vine motif.

Influence of religion and folk belief
Hindu women during 19th century used human and animal forms to tell stories of Gods and Goddesses and their Vahanas. Bengali women were free to draw upon their rich indigenous surroundings as well as their contemporary stories. To them the fabric was the artist and the person was the artisan. Mid 19th century, colour schemes and designs of Nakshi Kantha began to change to make them suitable for use on modern garments. 1940 Kabiguru Rabindra Nath Tagore and his daughter-in-law Pratima Devi trained Santali women in Birbhum District and quality work was produced under the tutelage of 'Kalabhaban' Artists.

Kantha consists of the simplest stitch in the language of embroidery – the running stitch, yet it is making a mark in the National as well as International Market. Nowadays,'Nakshi Kantha' is treated as traditional form of folk art as well as catering to top designers for their haute-couture creations. Nakshi Kantha in Bangladesh – Jessore, Faridpur, Mymensingh and Jamalpur have similar styles when it comes to stitching. These precious works of art remain silent witnesses of past, present and future of Bangladesh.

Stitches

The earliest and most basic stitch found in kanthas is the running stitch. The predominant form of this stitch is called the phor or kantha stitch. The other forms of stitches used are the Chatai or pattern darning, Kaitya or bending stitch, weave running stitch, darning stitch, Jessore stitch (a variation of darning stitch), threaded running stitch, Lik phor or anarasi or ghar hasia (Holbein) stitches. The stitches used in modern-day kantha are the Kasmiri stitch and the arrowhead stitch. Stitches like the  herringbone stitch, satin stitch, backstitch and cross-stitch are occasionally used.

Types
Kanthas generally denote quilts used as wrappers; however, all articles made by quilting old cloth may also be referred to by the same generic name. However, depending on the size and purpose, kanthas may be divided into various articles, each with its specific names. The various types of kantha is as follows:
 Quilt (lep in Bengali): A light quilted covering made from the old sarees/dhotis/lungis and sometimes from sheet cloths.
 Large spread (Naksi Kantha in Bengali): An embellished quilt embroidered in traditional motifs and innovative style
 Puja floor spread (Ason in Bengali): Cloth spread for sitting at a place of worship or for an honoured guest.
 Cosmetic wrapper (Arshilota in Bengali): A narrow embroidered wrapper to roll and store away a woman's comb, mirror, eye kohl, vermilion, sandal paste, oil bottle, etc. Often, a tying string is used to bind the wrap, as in later day satchets.
 Wallet (Batwa thoiley in Bengali): Small envelope-shaped bag for keeping money, betel leaves, etc.
 Cover for Quran (ghilaf in Arabic and Bengali): Envelope-shaped bag to cover the Quran.
 Prayer mats (Jainamaz in Bengali): Mats used by Muslims to say prayers.
 Floor spread (Galicha in Bengali): Floor coverings.
 Cloths wrapper (Bostani, guthri in Bengali): A square wrapper for books and other valuables.
 Cover (Dhakni in Bengali): Covering cloths of various shapes and sizes.
 Ceremonial meal spread (Daster khan in Bengali): A spread for eating place, used at meal time.
 Pillow cover (Balisher chapa or oshar in Bengali): A flat single piece pillow cover.
 Handkerchief (Rumal): Small and square in shape.
 Modern-day articles: Today newer uses are found for nakshi kanthas, such as bedspreads, wall hangings, cushion covers, ladies' purses, place mats, jewellery boxes, dress fronts, skirts border, shawls and sharees.

Motifs
Motifs of the nakshi kantha are deeply influenced by religious belief and culture. Even though no specific strict symmetry is followed, a finely embroidered naksi Maheen will always have a focal point. Most kanthas will have a lotus as focal point, and around the lotus there are often undulating vines or floral motifs, or a shari border motif. The motifs may include images of flower and leaves, birds and fish, animals, kithen forms even toilet articles.

While most kantas have some initial pattern, no two naksi kantas are same. While traditional motifs are repeated, the individual touch is used in the variety of stitches, colours and shapes. The notable motifs found in naksi Sabbir are as follows:

Lotus motif

The lotus motif is the most common motif found in kanthas. This motif is associated with Hindu iconography and thus is also very popular in the kantha. The lotus is the divine seat. It is also symbolic of cosmic harmony and essential womanhood. The lotus is also the symbol of eternal order and of the union of earth, water and, sky. It represents the life-giving power of water, and is also associated with the sun for the opening and closing of the petals. It is also the symbol of the recreating power of life. With the drying up of water, the lotus dies and with the rain it springs to life again. The lotus is associated with purity and the goddess Laksmi, the goddess of good fortune and abundance. There are various forms of lotus motifs, from the eight-petaled astadal padma to the hundred petaled satadal. In the older kanthas, the central motif is almost always a fully bloomed lotus seen from above.

Solar motif
The solar motif is closely associated with the lotus putki. Often, the lotus and the solar motifs are found together at the centre of a nakshi kantha. The solar motif symbolizes the life giving power of the sun. The sun is associated with the fire which plays a significant part in Hindu rites, both religious and matrimonial.

Moon motif
The moon motif has a religious influence, and is popular amongst the Muslims. Mostly it is in the form of a crescent moon accompanied by a star. This motif is particularly found in jainamaz kanthas.

Wheel motif
The wheel is a common symbol in Indian art, both Hindu and Buddhist. It is the symbol of order. The wheel also represents the world. The wheel is a popular motif in kanthas even when the maker has forgotten the significance of the symbol. The motif is relatively easy to make with chatai phor.

Swastika motif
Su asti in Sanskrit means it is well. As a motif in Indian art, it dates back to the Indus Valley civilization. It is symbol of good fortune. It is also known as muchri or golok dhanda.  With the passage of time, the design is more curvilinear than the four armed swastika of the Mohenjodaro seal. The symbolic design has significant influence in Hinduism, Buddhism, and Jainism.

Tree of life motif

The influence of this motif in Bangladeshi art and culture (as with kantha) may be traced back to the Indus Valley civilization. It is likely that the Indus people conceived the pipal as the Tree of Life with the devata inside embodying the power of fecundity. During the Buddhist times, the cult of the tree continued. Pipal is sacred to the Buddha because he received enlightenment under its shade.  It reflects the fecundity of nature and is very popular in Bengal. Vines and creepers play an important role in kanthas and they contain the same symbolisation as that of tree of life. A popular motif in Rajshahi lohori is the betel leaf.

Kalka motif

This is a latter-day motif, dating from Mughal times. The kalka or paisley motif originated in Persia and Kashmir and has become an integral image of the subcontinental decorative motif. It can be compared with a stylized leaf, mango or flame. The kalka is an attractive motif and number of varieties are experimented. Similar motifs can be found in traditional Kashmiri shawls.

Other motifs

 Water Motif:
 Mountain Motif:
 Fish Motif:
 Boat Motif:
 Footprint Motif:
 Ratha Motif:
 Mosque Motif:
 Panja or Open Palm Motif:
 Agricultural Implements:
 Animal Motifs:
 Toilet Articles:
 Kithen Implements:
 Kantha Motif:
 Palanquin Motif:

Borders
 
Most nakshi kanthas have some kind of border. Either a sari border is stitched on or a border pattern is embroidered around the kantha. The common border found in kanthas are as follows: 
 The Paddy stalk or date branch (dhaner shish or khejur chari)
 The Scorpion border (Biche par in Bengali)
 The Wavy or bent Border (Beki in Bengali)
 The Diamond border (Barfi)
 The Eye border (chok par in Bengali)
 The Amulet border (Taabiz par in Bengali)
 The Necklace border (mala par in Bengali)
 The Ladder Border (Moi taga)
 The Gut taga
 The Chick taga
 The nolok taga
 The Fish border (Maach par in Bengali)
 The panch taga
 The Bisa taga
 The Anaj taga
 The shamuk taga
 The wrench border
 The anchor (grafi par in Bengali)
 The pen border (kalam par in Bengali)

Collections

Bangladesh
 Bangla
 Design Centre, BSCIC
 Folk Art and Crafts Foundation
 Bangladesh National Museum

India
 Ashutosh Museum, Kolkata
 Calico Museum of Textiles, Ahmedabad
 Gurusaday Museum, Thakurpur

Organizations which make Nakshi Kanthas
 Bangladesh Rural Development Board (BRDB), Karu Palli Sales Centre
 Kumudini Handicrafts (cares), Bangladesh
 BRAC-Aarong, Bangladesh

Controversy regarding Geographical Indication 
In 2008, the Indian state of West Bengal applied for the Geographical Indication for Nakshi kantha, while Bangladesh was also a strong contender for the same. But due to absence of proper law on Geographical Indication in Bangladesh that time (which was later adopted), Bangladesh could not officially apply for the GI. The registry office handed over the Geographical Indication to West Bengal in 2008.

Bangladesh authority however later passed the "Bangladesh Geographical Indication (Registration and Protection) Act, 2013" in parliament and with other necessary preparations now waiting for the next re-applying time cycle to claim the Geographical Indication for Nakshi kantha to Bangladesh.

See also
 Nakshi pati, decorative sleeping mats made from cane, reeds, etc.

Notes and references

Notes

References

External links

 Registered GI tag details
 The Beautiful Art of Nakshi Kantha
 independennt-bangladesh.com-naksi-kantha
 Gurusaday Museum, India 
 Bangladesh National Museum
 Kantha Embroidery of West Bengal 

Blankets
Folk art
Bedding
Geographical indications in West Bengal
Bengali culture
Culture of West Bengal
Quilting
Embroidery in India
Arts in Bangladesh
Bangladeshi art
Bangladeshi handicrafts